= A Nacional Building =

- Edifício A Nacional
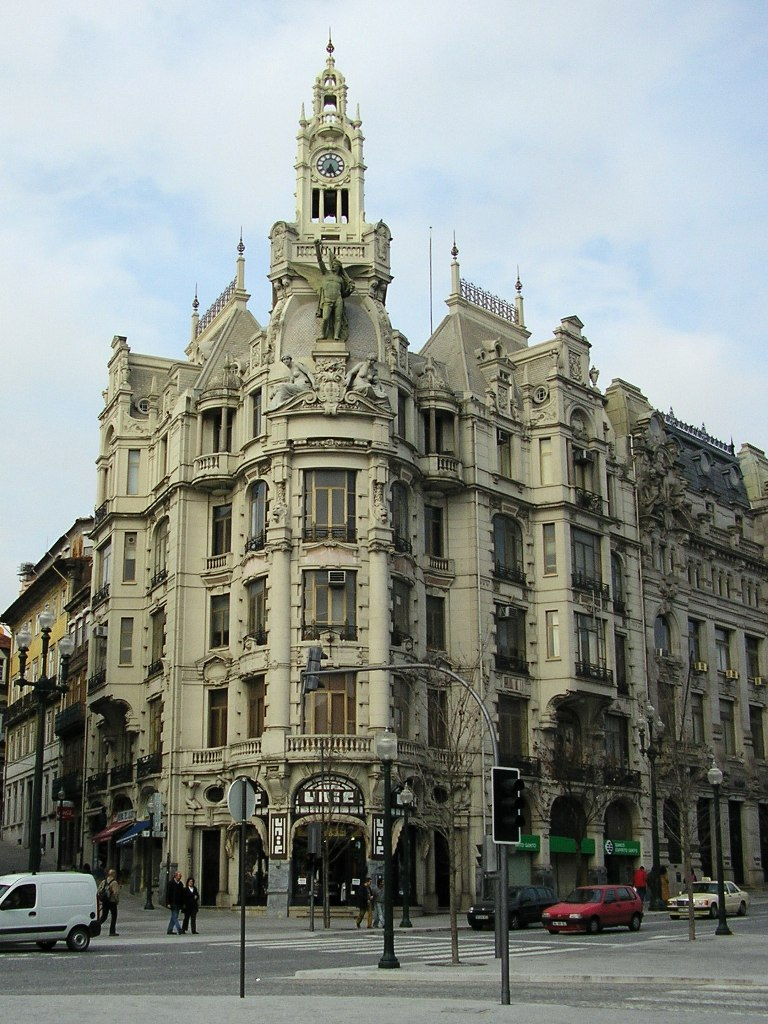
- The A Nacional Building in 2007
- Click on the map for a fullscreen view

General information
- Location: Porto, Portugal
- Coordinates: 41°08′49.87″N 8°36′41.81″W

The A Nacional Building (Portuguese: Edifício A Nacional) is a historic building located in Porto, Portugal.

== History ==
The building in 1944

Construction of the building, designed by architect José Marques da Silva, took place between 1919 and 1925. It was commissioned by the insurance company A Nacional and was developed as part of a broader urban development plan centred on the new thoroughfare of Avenida dos Aliados. The property is now recognised as part of a protected heritage district.

Between 2021 and 2024, the building underwent renovation and was transformed from office premises into luxury residential apartments.

== Description ==
The building occupies a corner plot at the intersection of Avenida dos Aliados and Praça da Liberdade, in central Porto. It fetaures a Beaux-Arts architecture and is characterised by a monumental composition and elaborate decorative detailing, reflecting the eclectic tastes of commercial and office architecture in the early decades of the 20th century.
